Kink or KINK may refer to:

Common uses
 Kink (sexuality), a colloquial term for non-normative sexual behavior
 Kink, a curvature, bend, or twist

Geography
 Kink, Iran, a village in Iran
 The Kink, a man-made geographic feature in remote eastern Alaska

Arts, entertainment, and media
Kink (film), a documentary about the internet pornography company Kink.com
 Kink, an autobiography written by Dave Davies, guitarist for the Kinks
Kink.com, a BDSM-focused Internet pornography company
 The Kinks, a British rock band
 The Kink (novel), a 1927 detective novel by Lynn Brock

Radio and television
 KinK, a Canadian documentary television series profiling some of the more unusual edges of human sexuality
 KINK and kink.fm, a radio station in Portland, Oregon, United States
 Kink FM, a radio station in the Netherlands

People named Kink
 Dick Kink (1921–1971), American politician
 KiNK (Strahil Velchev), a music producer and DJ in Sofia, Bulgaria
 George Kink (born 1982), German professional ice hockey player
 Louise Kink (1908–1992), survivor of the sinking of the RMS Titanic
 Marcus Kink (born 1985), German professional ice hockey player
 Rene Kink (born 1956), Australian rules footballer
 Tarmo Kink (born 1985), Estonian professional footballer
 Kink Richards (1910–1976), American football running back

Other uses
Kink (materials science), a crystallographic defect
 Kink, a solution to the sine-Gordon equation
 Kerberized Internet Negotiation of Keys (KINK), a Kerberos-based protocol used in IPSec
 Sun kink, a buckling of railway tracks caused by high temperature

See also
 Kinki (disambiguation)
 Kinky (disambiguation)